Synaphea trinacriformis is a shrub endemic to Western Australia.

It is found on undulating places and roadsides in small area in the Wheatbelt region of Western Australia near Arthur River where it grows in sandy-loamy soils over laterite.

References

Eudicots of Western Australia
trinacriformis
Endemic flora of Western Australia
Plants described in 2007